Eugenia Bitchougova (Russian: Евгения Бичугова; born 1958) is a Russian cross-country skier, who since 2010 has represented Italy.

Career
The great successes Bitchougova had in FIS Marathon Cup. In seasons 2000/2001 and 2002/2003 she took ninth place in general qualification. In total Bitchougova two times stood on the podium of this cup: in 2001 she was third, two years later became second in Italian marathon Marcialonga. The same cup she won 1995, but at that time it wasn't the part of FIS Marathon Cup. Except that, she started generally only in FIS Race. Only points in FIS Cross-Country World Cup she earned in 2004, when she was 18th in marathon Marcialonga, which exceptionally was the part of FIS Cross-Country World Cup calendar. She's never started in FIS Nordic World Ski Championships or Winter Olympic Games.

Achievements
FIS Cross-Country World Cup
Places in general qualification
season 2000/2001: 78.

FIS Marathon Cup
Places in general qualification
season 2000/2001: 9.
season 2001/2002: 19.
season 2002/2003: 9.

References

External links
 

1958 births
Living people
Soviet female cross-country skiers
Italian female cross-country skiers